Bald Eagle Mountain is a stratigraphic ridge in central Pennsylvania.

Bald Eagle Mountain may also refer to:

 A mountain in Bucks Lake Wilderness, northeastern California
 A summit in the Pilot Range of Utah and Nevada
 A mountain in Deer Valley, Summit County, Utah

See also
 Bald eagle (disambiguation)